Margaret Booth (née Murphy) is an Australian vision-impaired Paralympic Games athletics and goalball competitor.

Personal life 

Murphy was diagnosed with the genetic eye condition, retinitis pigmentosa, when she was just four-years-old; the same eye condition as her mother. During her high school years her sight began to deteriorate rapidly and she was enrolled into the Royal Institute for Deaf and Blind Children. After learning how to use a white cane through a program tailored by a Guide Dogs orientation and mobility specialist, she received her first guide dog, Matilda, in 1989. After finishing school, she undertook a secretarial course at TAFE before working for the Commonwealth Bank for nine years. During her career she taught people how to use computers.  In 2016 Murphy was appointed as a Guide Dogs NSW/ACT public relations speaker.

Sporting career 

At the 1984 New York/Stoke Mandeville Paralympics as a classified B2 athlete in the women's 100 m, 400 m, shot put, long jump and high jump. Miurphy won two medals: a silver medal in the women's high jump B2 event and a bronze in the women's long jump B2 event. 

As Margaret Booth, she competed at the Seoul 1988 Summer Paralympics in goalball.

References

Paralympic athletes of Australia
Athletes (track and field) at the 1984 Summer Paralympics
Paralympic goalball players of Australia
Goalball players at the 1988 Summer Paralympics
Paralympic silver medalists for Australia
Paralympic bronze medalists for Australia
Living people
Medalists at the 1984 Summer Paralympics
Paralympic medalists in athletics (track and field)
Visually impaired sprinters
Visually impaired long jumpers
Visually impaired shot putters
Visually impaired high jumpers
Australian blind people
Year of birth missing (living people)
Australian female sprinters
Australian female long jumpers
Australian female shot putters
Australian female high jumpers
Paralympic sprinters
Paralympic long jumpers
Paralympic shot putters
Paralympic high jumpers